The Shakey's V-League 12th Season Open Conference was the 22nd conference of Shakey's V-League. The opening ceremony was held on April 5, 2015 with the first triple header of volleyball games at the Filoil Flying V Arena in San Juan, Metro Manila. There were eight competing teams for this conference.

The PLDT Home Ultera Ultra Fast Hitters won its first Shakey's V-League championship, dethroning the defending champion, Philippine Army Lady Troopers, in three games.

Tournament Format

Preliminaries (PL)
Single Round-robin. Top four teams qualified for the Semifinals.

Semi-finals (SF)
The four semi-finalists competed against each other in a single-round robin phase.
 Top two SF teams competed for gold.
 Bottom two SF teams competed for bronze.

Finals
The battles for gold and bronze followed the best-of-three format, provided:
 If the battle for gold ends in two matches (2-0), then there will no longer be a Game 3 for either gold or bronze. A tie in bronze (1-1) would be resolved using FIVB rules.
 A tie in the series for gold (1-1) after Game 2 would be broken in Game 3.

Participating Teams

Preliminaries

|}

 

|}

Semifinals

|}

|}

Finals

Battle for Bronze

Battle for Gold

Final standings

Individual awards

Broadcast partners
 GMA News TV (local)
 GMA Life TV (international)

See also
 Spikers' Turf 1st Season Open Conference
 2015 PSL All-Filipino Conference

References

External links
 www.v-league.ph - Official website
 www.vleague.tk

Shakey's V-League conferences
2015 in Philippine sport